Danny Toala (born 26 March 1999) is a rugby union player, who currently plays as a midfield back or fullback for  in Super Rugby and  in New Zealand's domestic National Provincial Championship competition. He was born and raised in New Zealand, but has represented Manu Samoa internationally, for which he is eligible due to his Samoan heritage.

Early career

Danny Toala attended Hastings Boys' High School, where he played First XV rugby alongside future  teammates Devan Flanders, Folau Fakatava, Lincoln McClutchie and Kianu Kereru-Symes. He helped his team to two National Top 4 finals, narrowly losing the first 13 – 14 to Mount Albert Grammar School in 2016, but winning the second a year later against Hamilton Boys' High School 25 to 17 after an undefeated season.

Both in 2016 and 2017, Toala was named in the Hurricanes U18 squad.

Senior career

On 7 August 2017, the Hawke's Bay Rugby Union announced that four players of that year's successful Hastings Boys' High School First XV side, including Danny Toala, had signed with the union for the 2018 and 2019 Mitre 10 Cup seasons. Toala made his Magpies debut on 30 September 2018 against Canterbury. He has since re-signed with Hawke's Bay for 2020 and 2021.

Although he had played just four games for the Magpies, the  announced on 24 April 2019 that they had signed Toala until 2021, considering him "a real stand-out for the Hurricanes Hunters and Under-20 sides".

Due to being given limited playing opportunities, Toala only played four games for the Hurricanes during his 3 years at the franchise.

On 26 October 2021, Moana Pasifika announced that the new franchise had signed Toala for the 2022 Super Rugby Pacific season.

International career

In 2016, following his first successful First XV season playing for Hastings Boys' High School, Toala was named in the New Zealand Barbarians Schools' team that played matches against Australian Schools and Fiji Schools. He scored a try in both games.

The following year, Toala was named in the New Zealand Secondary Schools team for a three-match international series in Australia.  He played in two games, including a 34 – 11 victory over Australian Schools, and kicked nine conversions.

Toala was a member of the New Zealand Under-20 side that competed in the 2019 Oceania Rugby Under 20 Championship.

On 2 June 2022, Toala – who is of Samoan descent – was named in the Manu Samoa squad for the first time. He made his international debut on 2 July 2022 against Australia A in their first game of the 2022 Pacific Nations Cup, which they won 31–26.

Reference list

External links
 

1999 births
Living people
People educated at Hastings Boys' High School
New Zealand rugby union players
Samoan rugby union players
Samoa international rugby union players
Rugby union fullbacks
Hurricanes (rugby union) players
Hawke's Bay rugby union players
Moana Pasifika players
Rugby union players from Hastings, New Zealand